Pisheh Var (also Romanized as Pīsheh Var; also known as Pīseh Var and Pīshevar) is a village in Howmeh Rural District, in the Central District of Rasht County, Gilan Province, Iran. At the 2006 census, its population was 804, in 215 families.

References 

Populated places in Rasht County